Emily Fridlund is an author and academic best known for her novel History of Wolves.

Personal life
Fridlund grew up in Edina, Minnesota.

She has a bachelor's degree from Principia College in Illinois, an MFA in fiction from Washington University in St. Louis, and a Ph.D. in Literature and Creative Writing from the University of Southern California.

She currently lives in New York. She is married, and has one child.

Career
Fridlund is an assistant professor at Cornell University in the Department of English.

Fridlund's debut novel, History of Wolves, was a finalist for the 2017 Man Booker Prize (one of six novels to be named to the shortlist) and the PEN/Robert W. Bingham Prize for Debut Fiction. In 2018, History of Wolves won the Sue Kaufman Prize for First Fiction.

Her 2017 collection of short stories, Catapult, won the Mary McCarthy Prize.

Her creative writing has appeared in many journals including New Orleans Review, Southwest Review, Boston Review and ZYZZYVA.

Books
History of Wolves (Grove Atlantic, 2017)
Catapult (Sarabande, 2017)

References

External links
 Emily Fridlund official website

Living people
Novelists from Minnesota
American women novelists
Cornell University faculty
Washington University in St. Louis alumni
University of Southern California alumni
Principia College alumni
1979 births